Thinlā (Nepal Bhasa: थिंला) is the second month in the Nepal Era calendar, the national lunar calendar of Nepal. The month corresponds to Margashirsha (मार्गशीर्ष) in the Hindu lunar calendar and roughly matches December in the Gregorian calendar.

Thinlā begins with the new moon and the full moon falls on the 15th of the lunar month. The month is divided into the bright and dark fortnights which are known as Thinlā Thwa (थिंला थ्व) and Thinlā Gā (थिंला गा) respectively.

The main event during this month is the Hindu festival of Vaikuntha Ekadashi which is dedicated to Vishnu. It falls on the 11th day of the bright fortnight. The full moon is also a major religious holiday. In Nepal Mandala, the day is celebrated as Yomari Punhi (यःमरि पुन्हि). The festival celebrates the harvest. The special food of the day is a confection known as Yomari, a dumpling made of rice-flour dough filled with a paste of molasses and sesame seeds. In other cultures, the day is known as Dhānya Purnimā.

Days in the month

Months of the year

References

Months
Nepali calendar
Nepalese culture